Richard Leeper McClelland (24 November 1922 – 24 March 2004), known professionally as Richard Leech, was an Irish actor.

Richard Leeper McClelland was born in Dublin, Ireland, the son of Isabella Frances (Leeper) and Herbert Saunderson McClelland, a lawyer. He was educated at Haileybury and Trinity College, Dublin, and qualified as a doctor in 1945. He worked in that profession from 1945–6, then became a full-time actor.

His numerous film credits include The Dam Busters (1955) (playing Dinghy Young), Night of the Demon (1957), Yangtse Incident: The Story of HMS Amethyst (1957), Ice Cold in Alex (1958), Tunes of Glory (1960), Young Winston (1972), Gandhi (1982), and the acclaimed The Shooting Party (1985).

On television Richard Leech appeared in Dickens of London, The Barchester Chronicles, Smiley's People, three episodes of The Avengers in different roles, Redcap, Danger Man, The Doctors, The New Avengers, The Duchess of Duke Street, and starred in a Doctor Who story called The Sun Makers.

He married twice, with Helen Hyslop Uttley and Diane Pearson, and had two children: Sarah-Jane McClelland and Eliza McClelland.

Filmography

Film

 The Temptress (1949) (film debut) (uncredited)
 The Cruel Sea (1953) as Sailor (uncredited)
 Lease of Life (1954) as Carter
 Children Galore (1955) as Harry Bunnion
 The Prisoner (1955) as Minor Role (uncredited)
 The Dam Busters (1955) as Squadron Leader H. M. Young, D.F.C.
 The Feminine Touch (1956) as Casualty Doctor
 It's Never Too Late (1956) as John Hammond
 The Long Arm (1956) as 'Nightwatchman' / Gilson 
 The Iron Petticoat (1956) as Alex
 Time Without Pity (1957) as Proprietor of Espresso Bar (uncredited)
 The Good Companions (1957) as Ridvers
 Yangtse Incident (1957) as Lt. Strain RN
 These Dangerous Years (1957) as Captain Brewster
 The Birthday Present (1957) as Hawkins (uncredited)
 Night of the Demon (1957) as Inspector Mottram
 Gideon's Day (1958) as Minor Role
 The Moonraker (1958) as Henry Strangeways
 The Wind Cannot Read (1958) as Hobson
 Ice Cold in Alex (1958) as Captain Crosbie
 A Night to Remember (1958) as First Officer William Murdoch
 Dublin Nightmare (1958) as Steve Lawlor
 The Horse's Mouth (1958) as Hodges (uncredited)
 A Lady Mislaid (1958) as George
 Tunes of Glory (1960) as Captain Alec Rattray
 The Terror of the Tongs (1961) as Insp. Bob Dean
 I Thank a Fool (1962) as Irish Doctor 
 The Wild and the Willing (1962) as Police Inspector
 The War Lover (1962) as Murika 
 Ricochet (1963) as Alan Phipps
 The Cracksman (1963) as Detective Sergeant
 The Flood (1963) as Alec Weathersfield 
 Walk a Tightrope (1964) as Doug Randle
 Life at the Top (1965) as Doctor
 The Fighting Prince of Donegal (1966) as Phelim O'Toole
 The Railway Children (1970) as Doctor (voice)
 Young Winston (1972) as Moore
 Got It Made (1974) as Dr. Allen
 The Mirror Crack'd (1980) as Director of Photography (uncredited)
 Gandhi (1982) as Brigadier
 Champions (1984) as Beck
 The Shooting Party (1985) as Dr. West
 A Handful of Dust (1988) as Doctor (final film role)

Television

 The Third Man (1960) as Inspector Workington
 One Step Beyond (1961) as Orderly
 The Avengers (1962-1967) as Various Roles
 Danger Man (1965) as Colonel Montes
 Dixon of Dock Green (1965) as Major Summers
 The Saint (1967) as Stewart
 The Gathering Storm (1974) as Admiral Pound
 Edward the Seventh (1975) as Sir Charles Dilke
 Doctor Who (1977) as Gatherer Hade
 I Remember Nelson (1982) as Country Gentleman

References

External links

 Richard Leech Obituary in The Guardian  

1922 births
2004 deaths
Alumni of Trinity College Dublin
Irish male television actors
Irish male film actors
Irish male stage actors
People educated at Haileybury and Imperial Service College
Male actors from Dublin (city)
20th-century Irish medical doctors
Irish expatriates in the United Kingdom